Karun Arvand Khorramshahr Football Club is an Iranian professional football club based in Khorramshahr, Iran. They currently compete in the Iranian League 2.

History
Karun Khuzestan Football Club was founded in Ahvaz in 2012. In 2016, the club's rights were sold and the team was now called Karun Arvand Khorramshahr Football Club, and was based in Khorramshahr and competed in the Iranian League 2. Arvand Free Zone became the club's main sponsor.

Season-by-season
The table below shows the achievements of the club in various competitions.

References

Football clubs in Iran
Association football clubs established in 2012
2012 establishments in Iran